= IUCN category =

IUCN category, where "IUCN" refers to the International Union for Conservation of Nature, may refer to:

- IUCN protected area categories used to classify protected areas.
- IUCN Red List categories used to classify the state or threat to species' extinction.
